Over the course of its history, media adaptations of Batman have generated a wide variety of music produced in connection with both live-action and animated television series, and with the many Batman films.

Music associated with Batman media includes:

Television
 "Batman Theme", theme song of the 1960s series Batman.
 , musical score of the 1990s animated series written by various composers.

Film
 Batman (score), album of Danny Elfman's score for the 1989 film
 Batman (album), album by Prince with songs featured in and inspired by the 1989 film Batman
 "Batdance", single from the Prince album
 Batman Returns (soundtrack), album of Danny Elfman's score for the 1992 film
 "Face to Face" (Siouxsie and the Banshees song), song recorded for Batman Returns
 Batman Forever (soundtrack), compilation of songs by various artists from and inspired by the 1995 film
 "Hold Me, Thrill Me, Kiss Me, Kill Me", song recorded by U2 for Batman Forever
 "Kiss from a Rose", song recorded by Seal for Batman Forever
 Batman Forever (score), album of Elliot Goldenthal's score for the 1995 film
 Batman & Robin (soundtrack), compilation of songs by various artists from and inspired by the 1997 film
 Batman Begins (soundtrack), album of Hans Zimmer and James Newton Howard's score for the 2005 film
 The Dark Knight (soundtrack), album of Hans Zimmer and James Newton Howard's score for the 2008 film
 The Dark Knight Rises (soundtrack), album of Hans Zimmer's score for the 2012 film
 Batman v Superman: Dawn of Justice (soundtrack), album of Hans Zimmer and Junkie XL's score for the 2016 film
 Justice League (soundtrack), album of Danny Elfman's score for the 2017 film
 Zack Snyder's Justice League (soundtrack), album of Junkie XL's score for the 2021 director's cut of the film
 The Batman (soundtrack), album of Michael Giacchino's score for the 2022 film

Video games
 Music of Batman: Arkham City, albums of the score and songs of the 2011 video game

 
Film music